Lisa Ring (born 30 March 1993) is a Swedish long distance runner. She competed in the women's marathon at the 2017 World Championships in Athletics in London. She also competed in the IAU Trail World Championships 2019. In 2019 she won the Swedish 
Championships in 100 km road.

Her personal record is: (updated 2019)
10,000 Metres	34:07.49
Half Marathon 1:16:15 (2017)
Marathon  2:37:27 (2017)
100 km 7:58:11 (2019)

References

External links
 
Official site

1993 births
Living people
Swedish female long-distance runners
Swedish female marathon runners
World Athletics Championships athletes for Sweden
Place of birth missing (living people)
Swedish Athletics Championships winners